Bose Institute (Basu Bigyan Mandir) is a public research institute of India and also one of its oldest. The institute was established in 1917 by Acharya Sir Jagdish Chandra Bose, the father of modern scientific research in the Indian subcontinent. Bose was its director for the first twenty years till his demise. Debendra Mohan Bose, who succeeded the Nobel laureate Sir CV Raman as Palit Professor of Physics at the University of Calcutta, was the director of Bose Institute for the next thirty years. The institute pioneered the concept of interdisciplinary research in Asia and India in sync with global trends.

Academics

Research
Current concentration of research is in the fields of physics, chemistry, plant biology, microbiology, molecular medicine, biochemistry, biophysics, bioinformatics and environmental science. The institute pioneered the concept of interdisciplinary research in Asia and India in sync with global trends. The pioneering work of Jagadish Chandra Bose at the dawn of Bose institute on the effect of stimuli in plants was helpful in the establishment of the electrical nature of the conduction of various stimuli in plants. The institute has contributed to extremely important discoveries and has been home to internationally renowned researchers like Sambhu Nath De (discoverer of the cholera toxin), Debendra Mohan Bose (who pioneered the use of photographic emulsion plates in particle physics as attested by the Nobel laureate Sir C. F. Powell ) along with Bhibha Chowdhuri and others, Gopal Chandra Bhattacharya, Shyamadas Chatterjee (known for research on fusion) etc.

Museum
Jagadish Chandra Bose himself started the display of his instruments which, as a continuous process, made their way into the present museum in the year 1986–87. The main purpose of this technological museum is to display and maintain some of the instruments designed, made and used by Sir J. C. Bose, his personal belongings and memorabilia. The museum is housed in the main campus at 93/1 A. P. C. road (formerly Upper Circular road) and is open on all weekdays.

Funding
Bose institute is funded by Department of Science and Technology, Govt of India.

Notable researchers
Jagadish Chandra Bose
Debendra Mohan Bose
Gopal Chandra Bhattacharya
Bibha Chowdhuri
Shyamadas Chatterjee
Sambhu Nath De
Dipankar Home
Siddhartha Roy
Indrani Bose
Joyoti Basu
Sampa Das
Probir Roy
Subhrangsu Chatterjee

References

External links

 

Multidisciplinary research institutes
Educational institutions established in 1917
Research institutes in Kolkata
1917 establishments in India
Research institutes in West Bengal